The Association of the Oldest Inhabitants of the District of Columbia (AOI) is the oldest civic organization in Washington, D.C., representing long-term citizens of the city. The association is dedicated to the District's history and heritage as well as promoting ideas to improve the future of Washington for its residents.

It was founded by a number of the District's earliest residents, including Benjamin Ogle Tayloe, Peter Force and J. Carroll Brent together with 28 other prominent Washingtonians, on December 7, 1865 — a time of great changes to the city and its population following the American Civil War. The AOI predates the merger of the District of Columbia's separate political entities into a single government (see Washington County, D.C.). Originally members had to be at least 50 years old and have resided in the District for 40 years. Currently, AOI members must be at least 40 years old and must have lived, worked, or operated a business in the District for at least 20 years or be descended from someone who meets these qualifications. Persons not meeting these qualifications may become Associate Members (all privileges except cannot hold office).

The association became incorporated in 1903. The AOI met in the Old Union Engine House at 19th and H Streets, N.W., from 1911 to 1956, when the House was demolished. Over the years the AOI has supported many important civic initiatives including construction of the District Building, the installation of modern city street lighting, and the adoption of Washington's flag in 1938. The AOI opposed a new flag design in 2002. In support of both the L'Enfant and McMillan Plans, they have campaigned for the reopening of closed streets, including Pennsylvania Avenue in front of the White House and provide testimony at planning hearings when either of the major plans are threatened. On January 29, 2005, a statue of Alexander Robey Shepherd (territorial governor from 1873 to 1874) was returned to downtown Washington due to the association's efforts. The AOI commissioned a biographical, commemorative plaque that was placed at the base of the statue (located on the NE corner of the John A. Wilson (District) Building) in November 2010.

On July 4, 1920, the AOI invited members of a parallel African-American organization, The Association of the Oldest Inhabitants (Colored), Incorporated to a joint meeting to recognize the District of Columbia's fallen veterans of the Great War (1917-1918, World War I). While the AOI (Colored), Inc., was incorporated in 1914 and remained an active, vibrant organization well into the 1970s.  After a campaign, assisted by the "Washington Post's" John Kelly, 20 years of the AOI Colored's more recent records were serendipitously located by DC author/historian James Goode while conduction research for a book.  While interviewing the former owner of a house in the Palisades neighborhood of the District of Columbia he discovered that her grandfather, William D. Nixon, had been the President of the "Oldest Inhabitants, Incorporated" (the organization's preferred name over "The Association of the Oldest Inhabitants (Colored)" from 1942 until 1962.  With the assistance of AOI Historian Nelson Rimensnyder and President Bill Brown, William Nixon's descendants worked with archivists at Howard University's Moorland-Spingarn Library where the records were digitized and copies provided back to Mr. Nixon's family members.  While the majority of the organization's records (1914 through 1942) are believed lost, the current AOI's efforts to preserve the records of their parallel, African American organization were partially successful.

References
 An Invitation to Join The Association of The Oldest Inhabitants of the District of Columbia pamphlet (c. 2002).

External links
 Assoc. of the Oldest Inhabitants of D.C.

Oldest Inhabitants
Association of the Oldest Inhabitants
Seniors' organizations